Douglas Dennison Peters,  (March 3, 1930 – October 7, 2016) was a Canadian banker, economist, and politician.

Life and career
Peters was born in Brandon, Manitoba, the son of Mary Gladys (née Dennison) and Dr. Wilfrid Seymour Peters. In 1954, he married Audrey Catherine Clark (December 2, 1928 – August 2, 2007). He had two children, including professor David Wilfrid Peters, and two grandchildren, including actor Keir Gilchrist.

He received a Bachelor of Commerce degree from Queen's University in 1963 and a PhD from the Wharton School at University of Pennsylvania in 1969 where he was classmates with two other well-known Canadian economists, Arthur Donner and Robert Rabinovitch.

After serving as chief economist and senior vice-president of the Toronto-Dominion Bank, Peters entered politics in the 1993 election. He was elected as the Liberal Member of Parliament for Scarborough East. Prime Minister Jean Chrétien appointed Peters to the position of Secretary of State for International Financial Institutions. Peters retired from politics at the 1997 election.

In 1979, Peters and Arthur Donner wrote a book titled The Monetarist Counter-revolution: A Critique of Canadian Monetary Policy, 1975-1979. Douglas Peters and David Wilfrid Peters authored an article titled "Reforming Canada's Financial Services Sector: What Needs to Follow from Bill C8", that appeared in the December 2001 issue of the Canadian Public Policy journal.

According to author Linda McQuaig, Peters took a Keynesian economic prescription to government, and decided to leave politics when he found that his views were largely ignored.

References

External links
 

1930 births
2016 deaths
Businesspeople from Brandon, Manitoba
Canadian bankers
Canadian economists
Liberal Party of Canada MPs
Members of the 26th Canadian Ministry
Members of the House of Commons of Canada from Ontario
Members of the King's Privy Council for Canada
Politicians from Brandon, Manitoba
Queen's University at Kingston alumni
Wharton School of the University of Pennsylvania alumni